The Long Beach is a private housing estate in the waterfront of Tai Kok Tsui, Kowloon, Hong Kong. It comprises eight residential towers offering a total of 1,829 units. It was developed by Hang Lung Properties in 2006 and started selling to the public in 2008 and 2009. As of November 2016 one tower is still completely unsold, and the developer keeps releasing small batches of apartments - sold as if they were new - every month or so, to keep the price high. 
The town centre of the Hong Kong Institute of Education is also located there.

Education
The Long Beach is in Primary One Admission (POA) School Net 32. Within the school net are multiple aided schools (operated independently but funded with government money) and Tong Mei Road Government Primary School (塘尾道官立小學).

References

External links

Official website of The Long Beach

Private housing estates in Hong Kong
Residential buildings completed in 2008
Residential buildings completed in 2009
Tai Kok Tsui
Hang Lung Group